Guillermo Alberto García Ramírez (born 4 August 1969) is a retired Salvadoran professional footballer.

Club career
García played the majority of his career for Luis Ángel Firpo.

International career
García was a relative late newcomer to the national team set-up, he only made his debut for El Salvador aged 27, in an April 1997 friendly match against Guatemala and has earned a total of 38 caps, scoring 1 goal. He has represented his country in 6 FIFA World Cup qualification matches and played at the 1997, 1999 and 2001 UNCAF Nations Cups, as well as at the 2002 CONCACAF Gold Cup.

His final international game was a January 2002 UNCAF Nations Cup match against the United States.

International goals
Scores and results list El Salvador's goal tally first.

References

External links
 

1969 births
Living people
Association football defenders
Salvadoran footballers
El Salvador international footballers
2001 UNCAF Nations Cup players
2002 CONCACAF Gold Cup players
C.D. Luis Ángel Firpo footballers